The Dragons Back is a mostly ice-free ridge rising to  in the western part of the La Grange Nunataks, Shackleton Range. It was photographed from the air by the U.S. Navy, 1967, and surveyed by the British Antarctic Survey, 1968–71. Descriptively named by the UK Antarctic Place-Names Committee in 1971, from the spikes on the ridge crest giving an allusion of a dragon.

References 

Ridges of Coats Land